The next Italian general election will occur no later than 22 December 2027, and may be called earlier as a snap election.

Background

Electoral system 

The electoral law currently in force in Italy assignes seats in both houses of the Italian Parliament using mixed-member majoritarian representation. 

The 400 deputies are to be elected as follows:
 147 in single-member constituencies by plurality (FPTP).
 245 in multi-member constituencies by national proportional representation.
 8 in multi-member abroad constituencies by constituency proportional representation.

The 200 elective senators are to be elected as follows:
 74 in single-member constituencies by plurality (FPTP).
 122 in multi-member constituencies by regional proportional representation.
 4 in multi-member abroad constituencies by constituency proportional representation.

For Italian residents, each house member is to be elected in single ballots, including the constituency candidate and their supporting party lists. In each single-member constituency, the deputy or senator is elected on a plurality basis, while the seats in multi-member constituencies are allocated nationally. In order to be calculated in single-member constituency results, parties need to obtain at least 1% of the national vote and be part of a coalition obtaining at least 10% of the national vote. In order to receive seats in multi-member constituencies, parties need to obtain at least 3% of the national vote. Elects from multi-member constituencies would come from closed lists.

The voting paper, which is a single one for the FPTP and the proportional systems, shows the names of the candidates to single-member constituencies and in close conjunction with them the symbols of the linked lists for the proportional part, each one with a list of the relative candidates. The voter is able to cast their vote in three different ways, among them:
 Drawing a sign on the symbol of a list. In this case, the vote extends to the candidate in the single-member constituency that is supported by that list.
 Drawing a sign on the name of the candidate of the single-member constituency and another one on the symbol of one list that supports them; the result is the same as that described above. Under penalty of annullment, the panachage is not allowed, so the voter cannot vote simultaneously for a candidate in the FPTP constituency and for a list which is not linked to them.
 Drawing a sign only on the name of the candidate for the FPTP constituency, without indicating any list. In this case, the vote is valid for the candidate in the single-member constituency and also automatically extended to the list that supports them; however, if that candidate is connected to several lists, the vote is divided proportionally between them, based on the votes that each one has obtained in that constituency.

Opinion polls

See also 
 Elections in Italy

 List of next general elections

Notes

References

External links 
 Poll of Polls – Italy at Politico Europe

Future elections in Europe
Future elections in Italy